Thirayu Chueawong (born 22 December 1998) is a Thai para table tennis player. He won a bronze medal in the team class 3 event at the 2020 Summer Paralympics.

References

External links
 

1998 births
Living people
Table tennis players at the 2020 Summer Paralympics
Medalists at the 2020 Summer Paralympics
Thirayu Chueawong
Thirayu Chueawong
Thirayu Chueawong
Paralympic medalists in table tennis
Thirayu Chueawong
Thirayu Chueawong